Acacia calligera is a bush belonging to the genus Acacia and the subgenus Juliflorae across northern Australia.

Description
The glabrous and resinous branchlets with prominent ribbing. Like most species of Acacia it has phyllodes rather than true leaves. The patent to ascending phyllodes usually have an ovate to elliptic or oblong-elliptic shape that straight to slightly recurved at the apices. It blooms between February and August producing yellow flowers.

Distribution
It is native to a few small areas of the Kimberley region of Western Australia extending through the Barkly Tableland and Katherine Region in the top end of the Northern Territory and into the Normanton area of Queensland. It is often situated on plains, ridges or escarpments where it if found growing in red, sand or clay loam soils that are often skeletal or lateritic in nature as a part of shrubland or open Eucalyptus savannah woodland communities that have a spinifex or grass understorey.

See also
List of Acacia species

References

calligera
Acacias of Western Australia
Flora of the Northern Territory
Flora of Queensland
Plants described in 2006
Taxa named by Leslie Pedley